Biecco Lawrie Limited (BLL) is a government corporation under the ownership of  Ministry of Petroleum and Natural Gas , Government of India and was established in 1919 as British India Electric Construction Company Limited. BLL manufactures medium-voltage switchgears and have separate turnkey project and Electrical Repair division and is headquartered in Kolkata, West Bengal.

On the 10th of October 2018, the Government of India decided to shut down Biecco Lawrie.

References

Government-owned companies of India
Companies based in Kolkata
Companies nationalised by the Government of India
Indian companies established in 1919
Energy companies established in 1919
Indian companies disestablished in 2018
Energy companies disestablished in 2018